Gennadi Leonidovich Bortnikov (1 April 1939 – 24 March 2007) was a Russian and Soviet actor.

Biography 

His mother was a housewife, father and brother both pilots. After seven years at the school he enrolled in the engineering College, which was never finished. Went to work at a machine-building plant and after work, he went to attend night school. 
In 1962 he graduated from the School-Studio of MHAT and was accepted into the troupe of the Mossovet Theatre.

For many years Bortnikov was one of the leading actors of the theater, the most significant work  Raskolnikov in  Petersburg dreams  and Smerdyakov in the Brothers Karamazov  by Fyodor Dostoyevsky, the main role in the play based on the novel The Сlown  by Heinrich Böll.

In the movie Bortnikov debuted in 1961 the film  Adult Children; the largest job starring role Soviet spy in the film Blasted Hell. He also appeared in the 1978 film Centaurs.

Was fond of painting. As an artist and the author of the costumes Bortnikov has designed several performances.

Gennady Bortnikov died on 24 March 2007 from a heart attack. He was buried at Vvedenskoye Cemetery.

Bortnikov never married.

References

External links 
 
 Веб-музей Геннадия Бортникова

1939 births
2007 deaths
Russian male film actors
Russian male stage actors
Soviet male film actors
Soviet male stage actors
Male actors from Moscow
People's Artists of Russia
20th-century Russian male actors
21st-century Russian male actors
Honored Artists of the RSFSR
Moscow Art Theatre School alumni
Audiobook narrators